Khin Maung Win (born 8 April 1958) is a Burmese politician who currently serves as an Amyotha Hluttaw MP for Sagaing Region No. 7 constituency. He is a member of the National League for Democracy.

Early life and education
Khin Maung Win was on born 8 April 1958 in Wuntho Township, Myanmar. He graduated with B.Sc. degree from Shwebo Collage and Dip in Livestock from Yangon University. He had served as the chairman of township NLD in 1998 and also served as the chairman of district conference commission. He is an executive member of region and as the chairman of regionvenviromental conservation. He previously worked as a tuition teacher.

Political career
He is a member of the National League for Democracy.In the 2015 Myanmar general election, he was elected as an Amyotha Hluttaw MP and elected representative from Sagaing Region No. 7 constituency.

References

Living people
1958 births
National League for Democracy politicians
People from Sagaing Region
University of Yangon alumni
Burmese educators